The men's 1500 metres at the 2010 European Athletics Championships was held at the Estadi Olímpic Lluís Companys on 27, 28 and 30 July.

Medalists

Records

Schedule

Results

Round 1

Heat 1

Heat 2

Summary

Final

References
 Round 1 Results
 Final Results
Full results

1500
1500 metres at the European Athletics Championships